The Uh-Oh! Show is a 2009 comedy horror splatter film, written and directed by Herschell Gordon Lewis. The film revolves around a game show, The Uh-Oh! Show, where contestants play to win money by answering trivia questions, but appear to be dismembered for every wrong answer. Jill Porter (Nevada Caldwel), a reporter, suspects the gruesome attacks might not be fake.

Plot
A reporter named Jill Burton (Nevada Caldwell) is investigating a gruesome television game show called The Uh-Oh! Show where contestants literally "get rich or die trying". Fred Finagler (Joel D. Wynkoop) is the creator of the show. While a few lucky contestants walk away with big money, most end up killed in gruesome ways. Meanwhile, Jill is suspicious about the supposedly fake deaths and becomes determined to find out if they are real or not.

Cast
 Brooke McCarter as Jackie
 Nevada Caldwell as Jill Burton
 Joel D. Wynkoop as Fred Finagler 
 Krista Grotte as "Champagne"
 Lauren Schmier as Marie "Coco" Smith 
 Jack Amos as Dean
 Kenny Rogers as Oscar
 Bruce Blauer as Ray Hemming 
 Jarrett Ricker as Richard
 Lloyd Kaufman as The Pimp
 Trish Dempsey as Old Lady Blume
 Kenny DeMello as The Puppet Killer
 Herschell Gordon Lewis as Uncle Herschell / The Narrator

Release
On 26 October 2009, Herschell premiered footage for The Uh! Oh! Show at the opening night of The Spooky Movie Film Festival at the AFI Silver Theatre outside of Washington, D.C., following the 45th anniversary screening of Two Thousand Maniacs!. The film was planned to have had its world premiere at Spooky Empire's Weekend of Horror in Orlando, Florida on 11 October; however, according to Herschell Gordon Lewis's introduction to the film at the Abertoir Horror Festival in Aberystwyth, it wasn't ready by that time. The version shown at the Abertoir festival was the premiere but still an incomplete version of the film, lacking music, titles and some special effects.

A more complete version of the film was screened at the Cinema Wasteland movie convention in Strongsville, Ohio in October 2010, with Mr. Lewis in attendance. He held a question and answer session with fans following the screening.

Reception
The film won the Audience Choice Award at Texas Frightmare Weekend and Best Feature Horror Film at the Melbourne Independent Filmmakers Festival. In its review, film review site The Worldwide Celluloid Massacre describes the film as "the usual Lewis campy so-bad-its-good stuff" and reports that "the splatter is over-the-top and all in the name of silly, bad, cheaply provocative fun." Writing in the Underground Film Journal, critic Mike Everleth wrote that the film "has a strong — if loopy and nonsensical — premise" and that "none of it makes much sense, but the energy is high and although the violence is in the realm of the cartoonish, the actual effects are good and grotesque."

Home video 
The film was released on DVD on 30 August 2011.

References

External links 
 
 

2000s comedy horror films
American comedy horror films
2009 horror films
2009 films
American splatter films
2009 comedy films
2000s English-language films
Films directed by Herschell Gordon Lewis
2000s American films